The Pilgrim Family Farmstead near Kewaunee, Wisconsin was listed on the National Register of Historic Places in 1979.  It has also been known as Rasmussen Farm.

The farm complex includes a two-story brick veneered frame farmhouse building, on a three-foot thick fieldstone foundation.  It has a one-story kitchen wing.

It has a barn with a later windmill addition that is almost as large as the barn itself.

References 

Houses in Kewaunee County, Wisconsin
Tourist attractions in Kewaunee County, Wisconsin
Windmills in Wisconsin
Windmills on the National Register of Historic Places